Protitanops curryi is an extinct species of brontothere that lived during the Eocene, in the Western United States, especially in Death Valley, California, where the best specimens of the species P. curryi have been found.  It bore a strong resemblance to Megacerops brontotheres with its knob-shaped horns.  However, the position of the horns differed in Protitanops, in that they pointed straight up, rather than more forwards, like in Megacerops.

References

Brontotheres